Dalva is a 1996 American made-for-television drama film starring Farrah Fawcett and Carroll Baker.

Although Fawcett isn't the movie's only star, she is the only performer to be billed in the opening credits. However, on DVD and VHS home video packaging, Baker and Powers Boothe garner direct below-the-title billing.

Plot
When Farrah Fawcett's Dalva, who is part Sioux Indian, was a teenager, she fell in love with Duane and became pregnant by him. She later learns that Duane is also her half-brother. Her grandfather forces her to give the baby up for adoption. Five years later, Dalva finds Duane. He tells Dalva that he is dying; he rides into the sea in the sunset and shoots himself. Sixteen years later, Dalva finds love with a friend of her father's named Sam (Powers Boothe) who encourages her to find her son. She finds her son, and Dalva finds true love in the arms of Sam.

Cast
 Farrah Fawcett as Dalva Northridge
 Carroll Baker as Naomi
 Powers Boothe as Sam Creekmouth
 Jesse Borrego as Duane Stonehorse
Shawn Cady as Young Dalva
 Peter Coyote as Michael
 Laurel Holloman as Karen
 Rod Steiger as John Wesley Northridge II

References

External links 

1996 television films
1996 films
1996 drama films
1990s English-language films
Teenage pregnancy in film
Films scored by Lee Holdridge
American drama television films
1990s American films